Colin Schooler (born March 5, 1999) is an American football linebacker for the Arlington Renegades of the XFL. He went to Texas Tech University, where he played for the Texas Tech Red Raiders football team.

High school career 
Schooler played the first year of high school football at Dana Hills High School and the second at Tesoro High School and Trabuco Hills High School before playing his final two years at Mission Viejo High School which is located in Mission Viejo, California. He was a two-way player, playing as a running back and wide receiver on offense and linebacker on defense. He also played basketball and track and field. As a senior on defense, he recorded 77 tackles and 10.0 sacks and rushed for 1,161 yards and gathered 464 receiving yards with 25 total touchdowns.

Schooler made All-County First Team Defense and was named Defensive Player of the Year for Orange County after the 2016 season. He finished his senior year with 77 tackles, 4.0 TFL, 2.0 sacks, 2 INT, 2 PBU, and a forced fumble. In his two varsity seasons at Mission Viejo, he compiled 198 tackles, 13.0 TFL, 9.5 sacks, 3 INT, 9 PBU, 6 forced fumbles, and 4 fumble recoveries.

He was a three-star recruit by 247sports. Schooler received offers from multiple top football programs including Arizona, Fresno State, UNLV, Nevada, and New Mexico. He committed to Arizona in 2016.

College career

Arizona

2017
Schooler finished 11th in the Pac-12, and second among freshmen with 88 tackles (7.3 per game), trailing only freshman teammate Tony Fields II (91 tackles/7.6 per game). Schooler added 13.5 tackles for loss, most among all FBS freshmen, 3.0 sacks and two interceptions (returned one 66 yards for a touchdown vs. Washington State). In nine Pac-12 games, he posted 81 tackles (9.0 per game) and all 13.5 tackles for loss. Schooler was named Pac-12 Defensive Freshman of the Year.

Texas Tech

2020
Schooler announced on August 19 that he would be entering the transfer portal since the Pac 12 would not be playing football in the fall.

On October 24 against West Virginia, Schooler and fellow linebacker Jacob Morgenstern forced a fumble that defensive back Zech McPhearson returned 56 yards for a touchdown in the 34–27 victory. On November 14 against Baylor, Schooler made a touchdown saving tackle on quarterback Charlie Brewer in the 4th quarter; Baylor would have to settle on a field goal to end the drive. The goal line tackle on Brewer would prove to be a pivotal play as Texas Tech won 24–23. Schooler finished the game with 11 total tackles, one tackle for a loss, and a sack; for his efforts, Schooler was named the Big 12 Newcomer of the Week.

2021
On October 2, against West Virginia, Schooler finished the game with 15 tackles, one tackle short of his single-game record, and forced a fumble that was recovered by Devin Drew for Texas Tech. For his performance, Schooler was named the Big 12 Defensive Player of the Week.

Statistics

Professional career
The Arlington Renegades selected Schooler in the 11th round of the 2023 XFL Supplemental Draft on January 1, 2023.

Personal 
Colin is the son of Tom and Christine Schooler. Colin has one brother Brendan and one sister. Colin’s father, Tom, played football at Eastern Michigan. Colin’s mother, Christine, played volleyball at Cal State LA. His brother, Brendan, former Oregon receiver, transferred to Texas prior to the 2020 season as a graduate transfer. He is majoring in literacy, learning & leadership.

References

External links 
Arizona Wildcats bio

1999 births
Living people
American football linebackers
Arizona Wildcats football players
Arlington Renegades players
Players of American football from California
Sportspeople from Mission Viejo, California
Texas Tech Red Raiders football players